Acrolepiopsis vesperella is a moth of the family Acrolepiidae. It is found in Germany, France, Spain, Portugal, Italy, Croatia, Serbia and Montenegro, Greece and on the Canary Islands.

The larvae feed on Smilax aspera, Smilax canariensis, Tamus communis and Tamus edulis. They mine the leaves of their host plant. On Smilax species, young larvae make a short corridor which is  almost completely filled with frass. Older larvae live freely at the leaf underside, under a frass-covered web. On Tamus species, larvae live in a transparent full-depth mine without frass. The mine may have the form of a corridor, blotch or star. Pupation always occurs in a net-like cocoon. The larvae have a pale yellowish green body and head. They can be found in March.

References

Acrolepiidae
Moths described in 1850
Moths of Europe